Time and Eternity (Japanese: , sometimes called Toki to Towa) is an animated role-playing video game for the PlayStation 3. It uses 3D models for backgrounds and hand-drawn 2D sprites for characters and enemies. The story is centered on a princess, Toki, and her alter ego, Towa. The theme of "time" plays an important role, and is also utilized in the game's action-oriented battle system.

Plot

Gameplay
Battle is based on use of different skills, which the player character learns as she progresses through the game. Enemies use skills to fight as well. Throughout the game, the player switches between controlling Toki and her alter ego Towa. The switch happens on each level-up or upon using certain items. Toki and Towa have different skills: Toki is skilled at long-ranged attacks, while Towa is better at close-range fighting. The battles take place in real-time.

Development and release
In January 2012, the game was announced in Famitsu magazine. At that time, it had been in the planning stage for two years, and was 45 percent complete. Toki to Eien ~Toki Towa~ differs somewhat from many Japanese role-playing game by having a female protagonist, and by only having one playable character instead of a party. Producer Kei Hirono said that "We wanted to break the mold and step away from the current trend of male hero... to have a female hero playable character who is strong." As for only having one player character, Kei said that this is both to highlight the uniqueness of the character switching mechanic, as well as to reduce animation work. Another key difference from usual JRPG fare is that Toki to Eien ~Toki Towa~ eschews the epic "save the world" type storyline for the more personally relatable experience of marriage. Kei himself was getting married at the same time that the game was in development.

In May 2012, Imageepoch's CEO, Ryoei Mikage, held a meeting to determine whether Toki to Towa would be released in English.

A standard edition and a limited edition were released in Japan on October 11, 2012. The limited edition includes a 48-page artwork booklet, a soundtrack and drama CD, eleven custom PlayStation 3 themes, and a special storage box.

Speaking at the 2012 Taiwan Comic convention, Namco Bandai's Kei Hirono confirmed plans to release the game in English. In late December, a trademark application confirmed the English version's title to be Time and Eternity.

On February 21, 2013, NIS America revealed that they would release Time and Eternity in North America on July 16 and Europe on June 28 in regular and limited edition. While some English versions of JRPGs alter the content, such as changing character names or plot details, Kei Hirono has said that "Aside from the language, it's going to be the same as the Japanese version." The English version will also give players the option of either Japanese or English voices.

Soundtrack
The game's theme song, "Rewind", is performed by Japanese R&B and J-pop singer May J. The music score is by Yuzo Koshiro and Takeshi Yanagawa.

Reception

Time and Eternity was met with negative reception by critics and maintains a 42/100 average rating on Metacritic, pooling reviews from 40 separate online sources. Elliot Gay, associate editor of Japanator, gave the game a very negative review, heavily criticizing the characters, animation, plot, and gameplay. IGN gave it a 5.6, praising its unique combat system and character progression, but criticizing its dating simulator elements, technical issues, and repetition.

Not all reviews of the game were negative; Famitsu gave the game a 32 out of 40 rating. Richard Eisenbeis of Kotaku highly praised it, saying, "if you like JRPGs, this one is a must-play", though he did note the animation's "lack of polish".

References

External links
 
NIS America's official Time and Eternity site

2012 video games
Fantasy video games
Image Epoch games
Bandai Namco games
Nippon Ichi Software games
PlayStation 3 games
PlayStation 3-only games
Role-playing video games
Satelight
Single-player video games
Video games about time travel
Video games scored by Yuzo Koshiro
Video games developed in Japan